Civic Democratic Forum (GDF) is a liberal political party in Serbia. It was founded in 2019 by former members of the Movement of Free Citizens (PSG). It has positioned itself as a party that opposes the rule of Aleksandar Vučić, although it has also criticized other opposition parties.

History 
When Saša Janković resigned as president of Movement of Free Citizens, candidates for his successor were actor Sergej Trifunović and Aleksandar Olenik. The interim president was Rade Veljanovski. When Trifunović won with 60% of the vote, Veljanovski, Olenik, and several other members left the movement. On 2 March 2019, they formed Civic Democratic Forum.

In April 2019, they signed an cooperation agreement with Party of Modern Serbia. Together they issued a statement in which they present a solution for Kosovo. Their stance is that Serbia should exchange territories with Kosovo and recognize its independence.

In February 2020, the party formed a "European bloc" with the Party of Modern Serbia and League of Social Democrats of Vojvodina. It was also consisted of the newly-formed Serbia 21, and they announced their participation in the 2020 Serbian parliamentary election under the United Democratic Serbia banner. It failed to pass the electoral threshold after winning less than 1% of the vote.

It kept close ties to the Together for Serbia political party and its leader Nebojša Zelenović until early 2021. It did not participate in the 2022 general election, and instead, it stated its support for the We Must coalition.

Presidents of the Civic Democratic Forum

Electoral performance

Parliamentary elections

Belgrade City Assembly elections

Presidential elections

See also 

 List of political parties in Serbia

References 

2019 establishments in Serbia
Political parties established in 2019
Centrist parties in Serbia
Pro-European political parties in Serbia
Liberal parties in Serbia